Brandon Starc (born 24 November 1993) is a professional Australian high jumper. Starc currently trains in Sydney, Australia, under the guidance of his coach Alex Stewart. As a national representative and high achieving athlete, Starc is supported and represented through the New South Wales and Australian Institutes of Sport.

As a 16 year old he won a silver medal at the inaugural 2010 Summer Youth Olympics in Singapore with a +9 cm personal best of 2.19m.
Starc won his first National Senior Athletics Championships title in 2012 with 2.28m, going on to qualify as a finalist at the 2012 World Junior Athletics Championships, Starc has also competed in the finals at the 2014 Commonwealth Games, the 2015 World Athletics Championships, and the 2016 Summer Olympics. He won the gold medal at the 2018 Commonwealth Games.   Starc qualified for the 2020 Tokyo Olympics placing second in his Group and qualifying for the Olympic final. He placed 5th after jumping a height of 2.33m, just 0.04m short of the shared winners, Mutaz Essa Barshim from Qatar and Gianmarco Tamberi from Italy.

Early years 
Starc attended Lidcombe Public School and started his athletics career at Parramatta Little Athletics. He began to take his high jump achievements seriously and moved to Hills Sports High School. Starc also played cricket (like his elder brother Mitchell Starc) and football, but decided to concentrate on high jumping.

At the inaugural Youth Olympic Games in Singapore in 2010, Brandon won silver with a personal best of 2.19m. In 2012, he was placed sixth at the world juniors ahead of his senior debut in 2013 at the world championships.

Achievements
Starc first rose to prominence in the senior international track and field scene when, at 21 yrs of age, he made the high jump final at the 2015 IAAF World Championships, coming a creditable twelfth (the first Australian to contest a major men's high jump final since Tim Forsyth in 1997 at Athens). Moreover, Starc confidently produced a personal best of 2.31 m at his first attempt at that height during the qualifying phase of the competition.

At the men's high jump at the 2016 Summer Olympics in Rio de Janeiro he achieved a season best of 2.29m in the qualifying stage to make the final. He entered at 2.20m in the final, clearing his second attempt, but did not progress from there.

Brandon had a quiet 2021, not qualifying for the 2020 World Championships due to a shin problem, but scaled new heights in 2018. He won his third Australian National title on 17 February with a leap of 2.28m.  He set a new personal best of 2.32m in winning gold at the 2018 Commonwealth Games on the Gold Coast, Qld, Australia on 11 April. He competed in a couple of events in Japan in May, before a spectacular three month campaign in Europe. He equalled his personal best on 2 July finishing third at the Gyulai István Memorial in Székesfehérvár, Hungary. He achieved a new personal best of 2.33m winning a Diamond League meeting in Birmingham (GBR) on 18 August 2018.

He then set a third personal best for the year and equalled the Australian and Oceania area high jump records of 2.36m (set by Tim Forsyth in 1997) in winning the prestigious annual Eberstadt Internationales Hochsprung (high jump only) meeting in Eberstadt, Germany on 26 August. That is the third highest leap so far in 2018 (as on 1 September).  He then won the IAAF Diamond League Final in Brussels, Belgium, on 31 August, clearing 2.33m. Starc rounded off his 2018 European-summer campaign with a second place leap of 2.30m representing Asia-Pacific in the IAAF Continental Cup in Ostrava on 8 September 2018.

International competitions

Personal life
Starc is the younger brother of Australian cricketer Mitchell Starc and brother-in-law of Australian women's cricket wicketkeeper Alyssa Healy. He is married to fellow athlete Laura Turner.  He collects sports shoes and is a keen photographer.

References

External links
 
 Brandon Starc at Athletics Australia
 

Living people
1993 births
Australian male high jumpers
Athletes from Sydney
Olympic male high jumpers
Olympic athletes of Australia
Athletes (track and field) at the 2016 Summer Olympics
Athletes (track and field) at the 2020 Summer Olympics
Athletes (track and field) at the 2010 Summer Youth Olympics
World Athletics Championships athletes for Australia
Commonwealth Games gold medallists for Australia
Commonwealth Games silver medallists for Australia
Commonwealth Games medallists in athletics
Athletes (track and field) at the 2018 Commonwealth Games
Athletes (track and field) at the 2022 Commonwealth Games
Australian people of Slovenian descent
Diamond League winners
Commonwealth Games gold medallists in athletics
20th-century Australian people
21st-century Australian people
Medallists at the 2018 Commonwealth Games
Medallists at the 2022 Commonwealth Games